The 1913–14 Scottish Districts season is a record of all the rugby union matches for Scotland's district teams.

History

Glasgow District and Edinburgh District drew in the Inter-City match, each scoring 1 drop goal.

Results

Inter-City

Glasgow District:

Edinburgh District:

Other Scottish matches

Provinces: 

Anglo-Scots: [

Trial matches

Blues Trial: 

Whites Trial: [

English matches

No other District matches played.

International matches

No touring matches this season.

References

1913–14 in Scottish rugby union
Scottish Districts seasons